Volzhsky District (Julser kundem) is an administrative and municipal district (raion), one of the fourteen in the Mari El Republic, Russia. It is located in the south of the republic. Its administrative center is the town of Volzhsk (which is not administratively a part of the district). As of the 2010 Census, the total population of the district was 23,940.

Administrative and municipal status
Within the framework of administrative divisions, Volzhsky District is one of the fourteen in the republic. It is divided into one urban-type settlement (an administrative division with the administrative center in the urban-type settlement (inhabited locality) of Privolzhsky) and seven rural okrugs, all of which comprise seventy-four rural localities. The town of Volzhsk serves as its administrative center, despite being incorporated separately as a town of republic significance—an administrative unit with the status equal to that of the districts.

As a municipal division, the district is incorporated as Volzhsky Municipal District. Privolzhsky Urban-Type Settlement is incorporated into an urban settlement, and the seven rural okrugs are incorporated into seven rural settlements within the municipal district. The town of republic significance of Volzhsk is incorporated separately from the district as Volzhsk Urban Okrug, but serves as the administrative center of the municipal district as well.

References

Notes

Sources

Districts of Mari El
